List of International games played by the Australia Men's national handball team since 1994.

Games 1-50

Games 51-100

Games 100 onwards

Games 150 onwards

References
 Men's results on Handball Australia webpage
 Australia's IHF Profile
 Oceania Archive on Tudor 66
 World Cup Archive on Tudor 66
 ScoreBoard.com archive

National
Handball, national team
Handball-related lists